The 2013 Dallas Cup was the 34th since its establishment. The Dallas Cup is an international soccer tournament for invited youth teams, held annually in Dallas, Texas, United States. Twelve teams participated in the 2013 tournament. The competition was sponsored by Dr Pepper.

Participating teams

From AFC:

  Kashiwa Reysol

From CONCACAF:

  Tigres
  Club América
  Dallas Texans
  L.A. Galaxy
  Toronto FC

From CONMEBOL:

  Coritiba FC
  Fluminense FC

From UEFA:

  Manchester United
  Fulham F.C.
  Eintracht Frankfurt
  AaB Fodbold

Standings

Group A

Group B

Group C

Semifinal

Championship

External links 
 2013 Dr Pepper Dallas Cup XXXIV

Dallas Cup
2013 in American soccer